Dicken Fernando Panesso Serna (born 13 December 1951) is a Colombian businessman and politician who served as the Ambassador of Colombia to several nations, including Turkey and Ecuador, during the 2010s.

Ambassadorship
On 19 September 2011 President Juan Manuel Santos Calderón designated him Ambassador of Colombia to Turkey, and was sworn in on 4 November at a ceremony in the Palace of Nariño. He Presented his Letters of Credence to President Abdullah Gül at the Çankaya Köşkü on 16 November 2011.

See also
 Carlos Ignacio Urrea Arbeláez

References

1951 births
Living people
People from Pereira, Colombia
National University of Colombia alumni
Colombian engineers
Governors of Antioquia Department
Ambassadors of Colombia to Turkey